Deadwood is a ghost town in British Columbia. Deadwood existed in 1897 and was located several miles west of Greenwood, between Grand Forks and Osoyoos. A number of copper claims in the area gave rise to Deadwood. The copper claims include Big Ledge, Eagle, Butte City, Spoiled Horse, and Mother Lode. The Mother Lode became a great mine although Deadwood disappeared within a few years. Deadwood contained two hotels, a store, a post office and a school. Traces of the Algoma Hotel may still exist, although the town of Deadwood has disappeared.

References

Ghost towns in British Columbia